Messiah (HWV 56), the English-language oratorio composed by George Frideric Handel in 1741, is structured in three parts, listed here in tables for their musical setting and biblical sources.

Oratorio 

The libretto by Charles Jennens is drawn from the Bible: mostly from the Old Testament of the King James Bible, but with several psalms taken from the Book of Common Prayer. Regarding the text, Jennens commented: "...the Subject excells every other Subject. The Subject is Messiah ...".

Messiah differs from Handel's other oratorios in that it does not contain an encompassing narrative, instead offering contemplation on different aspects of the Christian Messiah:

Structure and concept 

The oratorio's structure follows the liturgical year: Part I corresponding with Advent, Christmas, and the life of Jesus; Part II with Lent, Easter, the Ascension, and Pentecost; and Part III with the end of the church year—dealing with the end of time. The birth and death of Jesus are told in the words of the prophet Isaiah, the most prominent source for the libretto. The only true "scene" of the oratorio is the annunciation to the shepherds which is taken from the Gospel of Luke. The imagery of shepherd and lamb features prominently in many movements, for example: in the aria "He shall feed His flock like a shepherd" (the only extended piece to talk about the Messiah on earth), in the opening of Part II ("Behold the Lamb of God"), in the chorus "All we like sheep", and in the closing chorus of the work ("Worthy is the Lamb").

Scenes 

The librettist arranged his compilation in "scenes", each concentrating on a topic.
 Part I "The prophecy and realisation of God's plan to redeem mankind by the coming of the Messiah"
 Scene 1: "Isaiah's prophecy of salvation" (movements 2–4)
 Scene 2: "The prophecy of the coming of Messiah and the question, despite (1), of what this may portend for the World" (movements 5–7)
 Scene 3: "The prophecy of the Virgin Birth" (movements 8–12)
 Scene 4: "The appearance of the Angels to the Shepherds" (movements 13–17)
 Scene 5: "Christ's redemptive miracles on earth" (movements 18–21)
 Part II "The accomplishment of redemption by the sacrifice of Christ, mankind's rejection of God's offer, and mankind's utter defeat when trying to oppose the power of the Almighty"
 Scene 1: "The redemptive sacrifice, the scourging and the agony on the cross" (movements 22–30)
 Scene 2: "His sacrificial death, His passage through Hell and Resurrection" (movements 31–32)
 Scene 3: "His ascension" (movement 33)
 Scene 4: "God discloses his identity in Heaven" (movements 34–35)
 Scene 5: "Whitsun, the gift of tongues, the beginning of evangelism" (movements 36–39)
 Scene 6: "The world and its rulers reject the Gospel" (movements 40–41)
 Scene 7: "God's triumph" (movements 42–44)
 Part III "A Hymn of Thanksgiving for the final overthrow of Death"
 Scene 1: "The promise of bodily resurrection and redemption from Adam's fall" (movements 45–46)
 Scene 2: "The Day of Judgment and general Resurrection" (movements 47–48)
 Scene 3: "The victory over death and sin" (movements 49–52)
 Scene 4: "The glorification of the Messianic victim" (movement 53)

Music 

By the time Handel composed Messiah in London he was already a successful and experienced composer of Italian operas, and had created sacred works based on English texts, such as the 1713 Utrecht Te Deum and Jubilate, and numerous oratorios on English libretti. For Messiah, Handel used the same musical technique as for those works, namely a structure based on chorus and solo singing.

The orchestra scoring is simple. Although Handel had good string players at his disposal for the Dublin premiere, he may have been uncertain about the woodwind players who might be available. The orchestra consists of  oboes, strings and basso continuo of harpsichord, violoncello, violone and bassoon. Two trumpets and timpani highlight selected movements, in Part I the song of the angels, Glory to God in the highest, and with timpani the closing movements of both Part II, Hallelujah, and of Part III, Worthy is the Lamb.

Only two movements in Messiah are purely instrumental: the overture (written as "Sinfony" in Handel's autograph) and the Pifa (a pastorale introducing the shepherds in Bethlehem); and only a few movements are a duet or a combination of solo and chorus. The solos are typically a combination of recitative and aria. The arias are called Airs or Songs, and some of them are in da capo form, but rarely in a strict sense (repeating the first section after a sometimes contrasting middle section). Handel found various ways to use the format freely to convey the meaning of the text. Occasionally verses from different biblical sources are combined into one movement, however more often a coherent text section is set in consecutive movements, for example the first "scene" of the work, the annunciation of Salvation, is set as a sequence of three movements: recitative, aria and chorus. The center of Part III is a sequence of six movements based on a passage from Paul's First Epistle to the Corinthians on the resurrection of the dead, a passage that Brahms also chose for Ein deutsches Requiem.

The movements marked "Recitative" (Rec.) are "secco", accompanied by only the continuo, whereas the recitatives marked "Accompagnato" (Acc.) are accompanied by additional string instruments. Handel used four voice parts, soprano (S), alto (A), tenor (T) and bass (B) in the solo and choral movements. Only once is the chorus divided in an upper chorus and a lower chorus, it is SATB otherwise. Handel uses both polyphon and homophon settings to illustrate the text. Even polyphon movements typically end on a dramatic long musical rest, followed by a broad homophon conclusion. Handel often stresses a word by extended coloraturas, especially in several movements which are a parody of music composed earlier on Italian texts. He uses a cantus firmus on long repeated notes especially to illustrate God's speech and majesty, for example "for the mouth of the Lord has spoken it" in movement 4.

General notes 

The following tables are organized by movement numbers. There are two major systems of numbering the movements of Messiah: the historic Novello edition of 1959 (which is based on earlier editions and contains 53 movements), and the Bärenreiter edition of 1965 in the Hallische Händel-Ausgabe. Not counting some short recitatives as separate movements, it has 47 movements. The Novello number (Nov) is given first, then the Bärenreiter number (Bär).

Part I

Part II

Part III

Alternative movements 

Handel revised the work several times for specific performances. The alternative movements are part of the Bärenreiter edition, the Novello numbers are given in parentheses.

References

Sources 
 
 Scores
 Deutsche Händelgesellschaft Edition, edited by Friedrich Chrysander, 1902
 Novello Edition, edited by Watkins Shaw, first published in 1959, revised and issued 1965
 Bärenreiter Edition, edited by John Tobin, published in 1965
 Peters Edition, edited by Donald Burrows, vocal score published 1972
 Handel's Messiah at the Center for Computer Assisted Research in the Humanities

External links 

 
 Georg Friedrich Händel / Messiah (1742) / A Sacred Oratorio / Words by Charles Jennens opera.stanford.edu
 George Frideric Handel (1685–1759) / Messiah Simon Heighes, for The Sixteen recording, 1997

Structure
Christian music lists